The Express class was a class of two schooner-rigged advice-boats of the Royal Navy. John Henslow designed the schooners to carry dispatches. To achieve speed they were long and sharp-lined. However, the Navy did not like them and so the Navy Board ordered no more after the launch of the two in 1800.

Both were commissioned in January 1801 for Jersey, and both sailed in a year or so for Trinidad. Express served until she was sold in 1813; Advice was lost in 1804 in the West Indies, or sold there in 1805.

The Navy tried again to find a design for an advice-boat. In 1804 it ordered 18 Ballahoo-class schooners. Then a year later it ordered 12 Cuckoo-class schooners. Both classes were built in Bermuda.

Ships

Citations

References
 

 
Schooners of the Royal Navy
Ship classes of the Royal Navy
Schooner classes